This article contains information about the literary events and publications of 1937.

Events
January 9 – The first issue of Look magazine goes on sale in the United States.
January 19 – BBC Television broadcasts The Underground Murder Mystery by J. Bissell Thomas from London, the first play to be written for television.
February 6 – John Steinbeck's novella of the Great Depression, Of Mice and Men, appears in the United States.
April – The Irish writers Elizabeth Bowen and Seán Ó Faoláin first meet, in London.
May 14 – BBC Television broadcasts a 30-minute excerpt of Twelfth Night, the first known television broadcast of a Shakespeare piece. The cast includes Peggy Ashcroft and Greer Garson.
May 21 – Penguin Books in the U.K. launches Pelican Books, a sixpenny paperback non-fiction imprint, with a two-volume edition of George Bernard Shaw's The Intelligent Woman's Guide to Socialism and Capitalism.
June
The British science fiction magazine Tales of Wonder first appears.
John Cowper Powys visits Sycharth, birthplace of Owain Glyndŵr, which inspires his 1940 novel Owen Glendower.
June 30 – The New England Quarterly prints poems by a colonial American pastor, Edward Taylor (died 1729), discovered by Thomas H. Johnson.
Summer – American-born writer Thomas Quinn Curtiss meets German-born novelist Klaus Mann in Europe and they start a relationship.
July
Buchenwald concentration camp in Nazi Germany is established around the Goethe Oak.
Rex Ingamells and other poets initiate the Jindyworobak Movement in Australian literature, in the magazine Venture.
The American academic librarian Randolph Greenfield Adams writes a controversial Library Quarterly essay, "Librarians as Enemies of Books", complaining of librarians downgrading books and scholarship in favor of other tasks.
July 4 – The Lost Colony a historical drama by Paul Green, is first performed at an outdoor theater in the place where it is set: Roanoke Island, North Carolina.
July 31 – Stephen Vincent Benét's post-apocalyptic short story By the Waters of Babylon, inspired by April's Bombing of Guernica, is published in the U.S. The Saturday Evening Post as "The Place of the Gods".
September 10 – The Soviet playwright Sergei Tretyakov commits suicide while under sentence of death at Butyrka prison in Moscow as part of the Great Purge.
September 21 – J. R. R. Tolkien's juvenile fantasy novel The Hobbit, or There and Back Again is published in England by George Allen & Unwin on the recommendation of young Rayner Unwin.
September 29 – The French playwright Antonin Artaud is expelled from Ireland.
October 6 – The fictional Mrs. Miniver appears in a column on domestic life by Jan Struther for The Times, London.
November 11 (Armistice Day)
BBC Television broadcasts Journey's End by R. C. Sherriff, 1928, set on the Western Front (World War I) in 1918, as the first full-length television adaptation of a stage play. Reginald Tate plays the lead, having long performed it in the theater.Caesar, Orson Welles's modern-dress bare-stage adaptation of Shakespeare's Julius Caesar, premieres as the first production of the Mercury Theatre in New York City.
December 21 – Dr. Seuss's first book, And to Think That I Saw It on Mulberry Street, is published by Vanguard Press.unknown datesThe National Library of Iran is inaugurated in Tehran.
The future novelist Angus Wilson becomes a book cataloguer at the British Museum Library in London.

New books
Fiction
Felix Aderca – Orașele înecate (Sunken Cities)
Eric Ambler – Uncommon DangerBibhutibhushan Bandyopadhyay – Chander Pahar (চাঁদের পাহড়, Mountain of the Moon)
Vicki Baum – Love and Death in Bali (Liebe und Tod auf Bali)Anthony Berkeley – Trial and ErrorGeorges Bernanos – MouchettePhyllis Bottome – The Mortal StormJohn Bude – The Cheltenham Square MurderMorley Callaghan – More Joy in HeavenJohn Dickson Carr (as Carter Dickson) – The Ten TeacupsAgatha Christie – Hercule Poirot storiesDeath on the NileDumb WitnessMurder in the MewsStuart Cloete – Turning WheelsMurray Constantine – Swastika Night Freeman Wills Crofts – Found FloatingA. J. Cronin – The CitadelJames Curtis – There Ain't No JusticeLudovic Dauș – O jumătate de om (Half a Man)
 Cecil Day-Lewis – There's Trouble BrewingIsak Dinesen – Out of AfricaPierre Drieu La Rochelle – Rêveuse bourgeoisieLawrence Durrell (as Charles Norden) – Panic SpringHans Fallada – Wolf Among Wolves (Wolf unter Wölfen)Max Frisch – An Answer from the Silence (Antwort aus der Stille)Zona Gale – Light Woman Anthony Gilbert 
 The Man Who Wasn't There Murder Has No TongueWitold Gombrowicz – FerdydurkeSadegh Hedayat – The Blind Owl (بوف کور, Boof-e koor)
Ernest Hemingway – To Have and Have NotRobert Hichens – Daniel AirlieKatharine Hull and Pamela Whitlock – The Far-Distant OxusZora Neale Hurston – Their Eyes Were Watching GodMichael Innes – Hamlet, Revenge! Margaret Irwin – The Stranger PrinceFranz Kafka (posthumously translated by Willa and Edwin Muir) – The Trial (first English translation of Der Process)
Irmgard Keun – After Midnight (Nach Mitternacht)
Kalki Krishnamurthy – Kalvaninn KaadhaliHalldór Laxness – Ljós heimsins (The Light of the World) – Part I, Heimsljós (World Light)Alexander Lernet-HoleniaDer Mann im HutMona LisaMeyer Levin – The Old BunchE. C. R. Lorac Bats in the BelfryThese Names Make Clues Ngaio Marsh – Vintage MurderA. E. W. Mason – The DrumCameron McCabe –  The Face on the Cutting-Room FloorCompton Mackenzie –  The East Wind of Love (first in The Four Winds of Love series of six books)
W. Somerset Maugham – Theatre Oscar Millard – UncensoredGladys Mitchell – Come Away, DeathR. K. Narayan – The Bachelor of ArtsElliot Paul – Life and Death of a Spanish TownRobert Prechtl – TitanicEllery Queen – The Door Between"Kurban Said" – Ali and Nino (Ali und Nino)Ruth Sawyer – Roller SkatesDorothy L. Sayers – Busman's Honeymoon Margery Sharp – The Nutmeg TreeBruno Schulz – Sanatorium Under the Sign of the Hourglass (Sanatorium Pod Klepsydrą)Naoya Shiga (志賀 直哉) – A Dark Night's Passing (暗夜行路, An'ya Kōro)"Siburapha" – Behind the Painting (ข้างหลังภาพ, Khang Lang Phap)Olaf Stapledon – Star MakerJohn Steinbeck – Of Mice and MenRex Stout – The Red BoxCecil Street 
 Death at the Club Death in the Hopfields Death on the Board Murder in Crown Passage Proceed with CautionAntal Szerb – Journey by Moonlight (Utas és holdvilág)Phoebe Atwood TaylorFigure AwayOctagon HouseBeginning with a Bash (as by Alice Tilton)
 Henry Wade – The High SheriffMika Waltari – A Stranger Came to the Farm (Vieras mies tuli taloon)Charles Williams – Descent into HellVirginia Woolf – The YearsFrancis Brett Young 
 Portrait of a Village They Seek a CountryChildren and young people
Enid Blyton – The Adventures of the Wishing-ChairC. S. Forester – The Happy Return (also as Beat to Quarters)
Eve Garnett – The Family from One End StreetHergé – The Broken Ear (L'Oreille cassée)Kornel Makuszyński – Argument About Basia (Awantura o Basię)Carola Oman – Robin HoodArthur Ransome – We Didn't Mean To Go To SeaKate Seredy – The White StagDr. Seuss – And to Think That I Saw It on Mulberry StreetJ. R. R. Tolkien – The HobbitLaura Ingalls Wilder – On the Banks of Plum CreekHenry Winterfeld (as Manfred Michael) – Timpetill – Die Stadt ohne Eltern (Timpetill – Parentless City, translated 1963 as Trouble at Timpetill)

Drama
Bertolt Brecht with Margarete Steffin – Die Gewehre der Frau Carrar (adapted from J. M. Synge's Señora Carrar's Rifles)
Karel Čapek – The White Disease (Bílá nemoc)
Paul Vincent Carroll – Shadow and Substance
Jeffrey Dell – Blondie White 
 Reginald Denham and Edward Percy Smith – The Last Straw
Ian Hay – The Gusher
Margaret Kennedy – Autumn
Arthur Kober – "Having Wonderful Time"
 Richard Llewellyn – Poison Pen
Robert McLellan – Jamie the Saxt
Robert Morley – Goodness, How Sad
J. B. Priestley – Time and the Conways
Walter Charles Roberts –  Red Harvest
Gerald Savory – George and Margaret
Dodie Smith – Bonnet Over the Windmill
John Van Druten – Gertie Maude
 Louis Verneuil – The Train for Venice
Hella Wuolijoki writing as Juhani Tervapää – Juurakon Hulda
John Ferguson, editor – Seven Famous One-Act Plays (published)

Poetry

David Jones – In Parenthesis (part prose)
Isaac Rosenberg (killed in action 1918) – Collected WorksNon-fiction
Hilaire Belloc – The Crusades: the World's DebateAlf K. Berle and L. Sprague de Camp – Inventions and Their ManagementRobert Byron – The Road to OxianaNapoleon Hill – Think and Grow RichCarl Jung – Dream Symbols of the Individuation ProcessWalter Lippmann – The Good SocietyJohn Neal – American Writers: A Series of Papers Contributed to Blackwood's Magazine (1824-1825) (edited by Fred Lewis Pattee)
Manuel Chaves Nogales – A sangre y fuego: Héroes, bestias y mártires de España (Fire and sword: heroes, beasts and martyrs of Spain)
George Orwell – The Road to Wigan PierEric Partridge – A Dictionary of Slang and Unconventional EnglishN. Porsenna – Regenerarea neamului românesc (Regeneration of the Romanian People)
A. L. Zissu – Logos, Israel, Biserica (Logos, Israel, The Church)

Births
January 1 – John Fuller, English poet
January 7 – Ian La Frenais, English television comedy writer
January 8 – Leon Forrest, African-American novelist and essayist (died 1997)
January 9 – Judith Krantz, American novelist (died 2019)
January 13 – Jean D'Costa, Jamaican children's novelist
January 14 – J. Bernlef, born Hendrik Jan Marsman, Dutch poet, novelist and translator (died 2012)
January 22 – Joseph Wambaugh, American mystery novelist and non-fiction writer
January 23 – Juan Radrigán, Chilean playwright (died 2016)
February 11 – Maryse Condé, Guadeloupe historical fiction writer
February 20 – George Leonardos, Greek journalist and novelist
February 21 – Jilly Cooper, English novelist and journalist
February 27 – Peter Hamm, German poet, author, journalist, editor and literary critic (died 2019)
March 14 – Jan Karon (Janice Wilson), American novelist and children's writer
March 15 – Valentin Rasputin, Russian writer (died 2015)
March 20 - Lois Lowry, American children's and young-adult writer
April 10 – Bella Akhmadulina, Russian poet (died 2010)
April 29 – Jill Paton Walsh (Gillian Bliss), English novelist (died 2020)
May 8 – Thomas Pynchon, American novelist
May 13
Roch Carrier, Canadian novelist and short-story writer
Roger Zelazny, American writer of fantasy and science fiction (died 1995)
June 1 – Colleen McCullough, Australian novelist (died 2015)
June 16 – Erich Segal, American novelist (died 2010)
July 3 – Tom Stoppard (Tomáš Straussler), Czech-born English dramatist
July 6 – Bessie Head, South African-born Botswanan fiction writer (died 1986)
August 3 – Peter van Gestel, Dutch writer (died 2019)
August 5 – Carla Lane (Romana Barrack), English comedy writer (died 2016)
August 19
Richard Ingrams, English editor
Alexander Vampilov, Russian dramatist (drowned 1972)
September 5 – Dick Clement, English television comedy writer
October 4 – Jackie Collins, English-born romance novelist (died 2015)
October 7 – Christopher Booker, English journalist and editor (died 2019)
November 9
Roger McGough, English poet
S. Abdul Rahman, Tamil poet (died 2017)
November 17 – Peter Cook, English comedian, satirist and writer (died 1995)
December 3 – Binod Bihari Verma, Maithili man of letters (died 2003)
December 11 – Jim Harrison, American novelist and poet (died 2016)
December 22
David F. Case, American novelist and short story writer
Charlotte Lamb (Sheila Holland, Sheila Coates, etc.), English romantic novelist (died 2000)unknown date – Parijat (Bishnu Kumari Waiba), Nepalese novelist and poet (died 1993)

Deaths
January 5 – Alberto de Oliveira, Brazilian poet (born 1857)
January 11 – Emma A. Cranmer, American author, reformer, suffragist (born 1858)
February 19
Edward Garnett, English critic (born 1868)
Horacio Quiroga, Uruguayan short story writer (suicide, born 1878)
March 7 – Tomas O'Crohan, Irish Gaelic writer and fisherman (born 1856)
March 8 – Albert Verwey, Dutch poet (born 1865)
March 15 – H. P. Lovecraft, American horror writer (intestinal cancer, born 1890)
March 25 – John Drinkwater, English poet and dramatist (born 1882) 
May 20 – Frederic Taber Cooper, American editor and writer (born 1864)
June 4 – W. F. Harvey, English horror-story writer (born 1885)
June 13 – William F. Lloyd, English-born Newfoundland journalist and prime minister (born 1864)
June 19 – J. M. Barrie, Scottish novelist and dramatist (born 1860)
June 22 – Jean-Joseph Rabearivelo, Malagasy poet (suicide, born 1901 or 1903)
July 18 – Julian Bell, English poet (killed in Spanish Civil War, born 1908)
July 29 — Ella Maria Ballou, American writer (born 1852)
August 11 – Edith Wharton (Edith Newbold Jones), American novelist and short-story writer (born 1862)
August 14 – H. C. McNeile (Sapper), English novelist and soldier (born 1888)
September 13 – Ellis Parker Butler, American humorist, novelist and essayist (born 1869)
October 15 – Samuil Lehtțir, Soviet Moldovan poet, critic and literary theorist (shot, born 1901)
October 16 – Jean de Brunhoff, French children's author and illustrator (born 1899)
October 17 – Florence Dugdale, English children's writer, widow of Thomas Hardy (cancer, born 1879)
October 22 – Chūya Nakahara (中原 中也), Japanese poet (meningitis, born 1907)
October 31 – Ralph Connor, Canadian novelist (born 1860)
c. December  – Filimon Săteanu, Soviet Moldovan poet (shot, born 1907)
December 9 – Frances Nimmo Greene, American novelist, short story writer, children's writer, playwright (born 1867)
December 24 – Elizabeth Haldane, Scottish author, philosopher and suffragist (born 1862)
December 26
Ivor Gurney, English war poet and composer (tuberculosis, born 1890)
Mrs. Alex. McVeigh Miller, American novelist (born 1850)
December 29 – Don Marquis, American poet (stroke, born 1878)unknown date — Clara H. Hazelrigg, American author, educator and reformer (born 1859)

Awards
Carnegie Medal for children's literature: Eve Garnett, The Family From One End StreetJames Tait Black Memorial Prize for fiction: Neil M. Gunn, Highland RiverJames Tait Black Memorial Prize for biography: Lord Eustace Percy, John KnoxNewbery Medal for children's literature: Ruth Sawyer, Roller SkatesNobel Prize in literature: Roger Martin du Gard
Pulitzer Prize for Drama: Moss Hart, George S. Kaufman, You Can't Take It with YouPulitzer Prize for Poetry: Robert Frost, A Further RangePulitzer Prize for the Novel: Margaret Mitchell, Gone with the Wind''
King's Gold Medal for Poetry: W. H. Auden

References

External link

 
Years of the 20th century in literature